Bob Foster (born January 12, 1941) is an American football coach. He served as the head football coach at the University of California, Davis (UC Davis) from 1989 to 1992, compiling a record of 30–11–1.

Head coaching record

College

References

External links
 California profile

1941 births
Living people
American football running backs
California Golden Bears football coaches
Colorado Buffaloes football coaches
Oregon Ducks football coaches
UC Davis Aggies football coaches
UC Davis Aggies football players
Willamette Bearcats football coaches
High school football coaches in California